The former French Roman Catholic Diocese of Toulon existed until the Concordat of 1801. Its seat was in Toulon.

Bishops

To 1000
 c. 451: Honoratus
 † c. 472: Saint Gratien
 524–549: Cyprian
 549–c. 554: Palladius (or Palais)
 573–585: Desiderius
 c. 601: Mennas
 c. 614: Hiltigisus (de Tholosa ?)
 c. 680: Taurinus
 Gandalmarus
 c. 879: Eustorgius
 c. 899: Armodus

1000 to 1300
 1021–1056: Théodad de Jandal
 25 January 1056 – 1079: Wilhelm I.
 1096–1110: Ariminus or Aiminus
 1117 – September 1165: Wilhelm II.
 1168–1183: Pierre I. Isnard
 1183–1201: Desiderius
 c. 1201: Ponce Rausianus
 Guillaume III. de Soliers
 1212–1223: Stephanus
 1223–1232: Jean I. des Baux
 1234–c. 1257: Rostaing
 1257–c. 1266: Bertrand (?)
 1266–1277: Gualterus (or Gauthier) Gaufredi
 17 May 1279 – 1289: Jean II.
 1293–1311: Raymond I. de Rostaing

1300 to 1500
 1314–c. 1317: Ponce II.
 1317–1323: Elzéar de Glandèves
 1324–1325: Hugues I.
 1325–1326: Pierre II. de Guillaume
 1328–1329: Fulco
 1329–1345: Jacques de Corvo
 9 December 1345 – 1357: Hugues II. Le Baille
 1 April 1357 – 1358: Pierre III.
 1358–1364: Raymond II. de Daron
 1364–1368: Guillaume IV. de La Voulte
 1368–1380: Jean III. Stephani de Girbioto
 1395 – 4 or 5 September 1402: Pierre IV de Marville
 1403–1409: Jean IV.
 13 February 1411 – 27 July 1427: Vitalis
 1428–1434: Nicolas I. Draconich
 1437–1454: Jean V. Gombard
 1454–1483: Jean VI. Huet
 1491–1496: Jean VII. de Mixon
 1497–1498: Guillaume Briçonnet
 1498–1516: Denis Briçonnet

1500 to 1800
 1516: Niccolò Fieschi
 1516 – 3 September 1518: Philos Roverella
 3 September 1518 – 1524: Niccolò Fieschi (second time)
 Claudio Tolomei ?
 22 July 1524 – 1548: Cardinal Agostino Trivulzio  (Augustin or Auguste Trivulce)
 1548–1559: Cardinal (1557) Antonio Trivulzio (iuniore)
 c. 1560–1566: Cardinal (1586) Girolamo della Rovere (Jérôme de La Rovère)
 1566–1571: Thomas Jacomel
 1571 or 1572 – 1588: Guillaume VI. du Blanc
 1588–1599: Vacant
 1599 – 2 May 1626: Aegidius de Septres or de Soystres
 1628–1639: Auguste II. de Forbin
 6 May 1640 – 1659: Jacques II. Danès de Marly
 12 January 1659 – 5 December 1662: Pierre V. Pingré
 1664 – 29 April 1675: Louis I. de Forbin d'Opède
 1675 – 15 November 1682: Jean VIII. de Vintimille du Luc (previously bishop of Digne (1669–1675)
 1684–1712: Armand-Louis Bonin de Chalucet
 15 August 1712 – 12 September 1737: Louis II. de La Tour du Pin de Montauban
 1737 – 16 April 1759: Louis-Albert Joly de Chouin
 12 September 1759 – 1786: Alexandre Lascaris de Vintimille
 13 August 1786 – 1801: Elléon de Castellane-Mazangues

See also 
 Catholic Church in France
 List of Catholic dioceses in France

References

Bibliography

Reference Sources
 pp. 548–549. (Use with caution; obsolete)
  p. 301. (in Latin)
 p. 175.

 p. 219.

Studies

Toulon
Toulon
1801 disestablishments in France